Robert Bynt (died before 1431) was an English Member of Parliament.

He was a Member (MP) of the Parliament of England for Lewes in 1402.

References

14th-century births
15th-century deaths
15th-century English people
People from Lewes
English MPs 1402